Arfon is a constituency in Wales represented in the House of Commons of the UK Parliament at Westminster. Although it is relatively large by geographical area, the constituency is a predominantly urban rather than rural seat, with the majority  of the population living in the two towns of Bethesda and Caernarfon, as well as in the city of Bangor, on which the constituency is based. "Arfon" is a historical name for the area, meaning "facing Anglesey"; it is also the name of the former district council. This seat was created by the Welsh Boundary Commission in time for the 2010 general election; it replaced the old seat of Caernarfon. Bangor was in the old seat of Conwy. The same boundaries were used for the Arfon Welsh Assembly constituency in the 2007 Welsh Assembly election.

It is the smallest constituency on the mainland of Great Britain by electorate, and larger only than the two Scottish island constituencies, Na h-Eileanan an Iar and Orkney and Shetland. The total population as of the 2011 census was 60,573.

The Arfon division of Caernarvonshire was a former UK Parliament constituency, which existed from 1885 until 1918. Before 1885 and after 1918 the area was part of the Caernarvonshire constituency. The Liberal MP William Rathbone represented the Arfon seat until 1895, followed by fellow Liberal William Jones. Upon the death of Mr Jones, Griffith C. Rees, for the Liberal Party, was elected unopposed at the subsequent by-election.

On November 11th, 2022, current MP Hywel Williams has announced his intention to stand down at the next General Election after more than 20 years as MP.

Boundaries

When first created in 1885, the constituency was defined as the Petty Sessional Divisions of Bangor, Conway and Nant-Conway, with the Parishes of Llanddeinilen and Llanberis (which were within the Carnarvon Petty Sessional Division). The constituency included the boroughs of Bangor and Conway which were part of the Carnarvon District of Boroughs constituency; only those who owned freehold land within the boroughs could vote in elections for the Arfon constituency as a second vote.

The new constituency was a merger of northern Caernarfon and western Conwy.
The electoral wards used to create the current constituency are entirely within the preserved county of Gwynedd; They are Arllechwedd, Bethel, Bontnewydd, Cadnant, Cwm-y-Glo, Deiniol, Deiniolen, Dewi, Garth, Gerlan, Glyder, Groeslon, Hendre, Hirael, Llanberis, Llanllyfni, Llanrug, Llanwnda, Marchog, Menai (Bangor), Menai (Caernarfon), Ogwen, Peblig, Penisarwaun, Pentir, Penygroes, Seiont, Talysarn, Tregarth and Mynydd Llandygai, Waunfawr and Y Felinheli.

Electoral history (current constituency)
The latest boundary change created a battleground in Arfon particularly for Labour, Plaid Cymru, and the Conservatives, with the latter being labelled as a 'resurgent' party by the Caernarfon Herald. The scale of contention had been reached due to the large shift in boundary changes which in turn created a need within each party to achieve a relatively unforeseen outcome. Plaid Cymru had previously never represented Bangor, which had been held by Conservative Wyn Roberts for twenty-seven years and a further thirteen under Labour's Betty Williams. It had however also been more than thirty years since Caernarfon had been represented by anyone other than Plaid Cymru.

In the event, Plaid gained the seat (which had been notionally Labour) in 2010 and held it in 2015; their victory in 2017 was by just 92 votes, the tightest margin in Wales in that election.

Members of Parliament

MPs 1885–1918

MPs since 2010

Elections

Elections 1885–1918

Elections in the 1880s

Elections in the 1890s

Elections in the 1900s

Elections in the 1910s

Elections in the 21st century

Elections in the 2010s

*Served as MP for the predecessor seat of Caernarfon in the 2001-2010 Parliament

See also
 Arfon (Senedd constituency)
 List of parliamentary constituencies in Gwynedd
 List of parliamentary constituencies in Wales

Notes

References

External links
Politics Resources (Election results from 1922 onwards)
Electoral Calculus (Election results from 1955 onwards)
2017 Election House Of Commons Library 2017 Election report
A Vision Of Britain Through Time (Constituency elector numbers)

Further reading

 Boundaries of Parliamentary Constituencies 1885-1972, compiled and edited by F.W.S. Craig (Political Reference Publications 1972)

History of Caernarfonshire
History of Gwynedd
Parliamentary constituencies in North Wales
Constituencies of the Parliament of the United Kingdom established in 1885
Constituencies of the Parliament of the United Kingdom disestablished in 1918
Politics of Caernarfonshire
Constituencies of the Parliament of the United Kingdom established in 2010